The Glosas Emilianenses (Spanish for "glosses of [the monastery of Saint] Millán/Emilianus") are glosses written in the 10th or 11th century to a 9th-century Latin codex. These marginalia are important as early examples of writing in a form of Romance similar to Spanish, and in Basque. The anonymous author is generally assumed to have been a monk at the monastery now known as Suso ("the upper one"), one of the twin monasteries of San Millán de la Cogolla (now in La Rioja, Spain, then in the Kingdom of Navarre).
He wrote about a thousand years ago in three languages:
 A simplified version of Latin
 The medieval form of a Hispanic Romance language (traditionally regarded as Castilian or Old Spanish, but now most often classified as Navarro-Aragonese or a related dialect);
 Medieval Basque

The Glosses were formerly considered to include the first instances of early Spanish. However, in November 2010, the Real Academia Española declared that the first appearances of written Spanish can be found in the Cartularies of Valpuesta, documents in Latin from the province of Burgos which predate the glosses.

Text
The codex is known as Aemilianensis 60 (Aemilianus is Latin for Emilian, "Millán" or "Emiliano" in modern Spanish). It is a compilation of several Latin codices, including Verba seniorum, Passio martyrum Cosmae et Damiani, Sermones beati Augustini.

Some of the marginalia are grammar notes, others are additions and others, glosses.

Location of the Glosas Emilianenses

The codex was preserved at San Millan in the monastery library at Yuso (the lower re-foundation of the monastery).
The place where it was produced is uncertain (M. C. Díaz y Díaz proposes the Pyrenees), but it is often assumed to be San Millán. The vernacular language in the region is now Spanish, but there are still some Basque place-names nearby, e.g. Ezcaray, which suggest that the inhabitants were Basque speaking in the past.

The significance of the glosses was recognised in the early twentieth century when the manuscript was brought to the attention of the philologist Ramón Menéndez Pidal. The manuscript's current location since 1951 is the Real Academia de la Historia in Madrid.

Romance glosses

There is still some debate as to whether the Iberian Romance language of the glosses should be classed as an early form of Castilian or of Aragonese, although some recent studies show that most features belong indeed to the latter. It is not the only text to be difficult to classify: other texts traditionally assumed to be in Old Spanish, like the Kharjas, are proved to be in a different medieval Romance, Mozarabic, which happens to be classified along with Aragonese in a Pyrenean-Mozarabic group. Some scholars have proposed that it is anachronistic to classify such varieties of Ibero-Romance according to dialectal labels based on geographical particularism before the thirteenth century, leaving the Glosas to be understood as "in an unspecialized informal register of Ibero-Romance".

However the Romance language of the glosses should best be classified, San Millán de la Cogolla's former reputation as the "birthplace of the Spanish language" was important in its designation as a World Heritage Site ("cultural" type) in 1997. Subsequently the Cartularies of Valpuesta were recognised as the earliest Spanish text. They are written in a late form of Latin which has been described as being "assaulted by a living language" (una lengua latina asaltada por una lengua viva).

Text and translation
The longest gloss appears on page 72 of the manuscripts. The Spanish philologist Dámaso Alonso called this little prayer the "first cry of the Spanish language" (in Spanish: "el primer vagido de la lengua española").

{{quote|TranslationWith the help of our lord Lord Christ, LordSavior, Lordwho is in honor,Lord that hascommand withthe Father, with the Holy Spiritfor ever and ever.God Omnipotent, make usdo such a service thatbefore His facejoyful we are. Amen.}}

Comparative table
Comparison of some words used in the glosses, along with their current corresponding forms in Aragonese, Spanish and Latin language. English translation provided.

Basque glossesAemilianensis 60 has been publicized as the earliest known codex with inscriptions in Basque, though other codices are posited.

Only two of the glosses in Aemilianensis 60'' (of a total of about one thousand) are actually in Basque. These short texts (only 6 words in total) can be seen on the 1974 plaque. However, it has been suggested that some of the Romance glosses reflect the influence of the Basque language, the implication being that their author was a fluent Basque-speaker.

References

See also
 Spanish language
 Monasteries of San Millán de la Cogolla
 Navarro-Aragonese dialect
 Early Spanish Literature and the Middle Ages
 Basque language
 Wikisource: Glosas Emilianenses

Earliest known manuscripts by language
Spanish manuscripts
Spanish literature
Spanish language
Basque language
Riojan culture
History of the Spanish language
9th-century manuscripts
10th-century manuscripts
11th-century manuscripts
Christian manuscripts